Alyson Hannigan (born March 24, 1974) is an American actress. After starting her career at age four with appearances in commercials, she moved to Hollywood at age 11 and soon got an agent.

Hannigan began her film career with supporting roles in the comedy films Impure Thoughts (1986) and My Stepmother Is an Alien (1988), getting a Young Artist Award nomination for the latter. In 1999, she began starring in the American Pie film series as Michelle Flaherty, the films' primary love interest, appearing in every film in the series from 1999 to 2012. For her role in the series, she was nominated for three Teen Choice Awards and won a Young Hollywood Award. She went on to star in the parody film Date Movie (2006), the slasher film You Might Be the Killer (2018), and the superhero film Flora & Ulysses (2021).

Hannigan got her start in television starring in the short-lived sitcom Free Spirit from 1989 to 1990, for which she earned a Young Artist Award nomination. After several minor roles in television films and other series, she appeared in her breakout role as teenage witch Willow Rosenberg in the supernatural drama series Buffy the Vampire Slayer, appearing in every episode from 1997 to 2003. Her role on the show was critically acclaimed and won her the Saturn Award for Best Supporting Actress on Television and a Teen Choice Award. From 2005 to 2014, she starred as Lily Aldrin in the sitcom How I Met Your Mother, for which she won two People's Choice Awards. Hannigan has hosted the television show Penn & Teller: Fool Us since 2016 and provides the voice of Claire Clancy in the Disney Junior animated series Fancy Nancy (2018–2022).

Early life and education
Hannigan was born on March 24, 1974 in Washington, D.C., the only child of Emilie (Posner) Haas, a real-estate agent, and Alan Hannigan, a Teamsters trucker. Her father is of Irish ancestry and her mother is Jewish. At age four, Hannigan began appearing in commercials. She moved to Hollywood at age 11.

Living with her mother and attending North Hollywood High School, she successfully auditioned for agents while visiting her father in Santa Barbara. After high school, she attended California State University, Northridge, where she was a member of the Alpha Chi Omega sorority and earned a degree in psychology.

Career 
Hannigan's first major film role was in My Stepmother Is an Alien, a science-fiction comedy released in 1988; one of her co-stars in the film was actor Seth Green, who later joined her in the regular cast of Buffy as her on-screen boyfriend. In 1989, her first regular role on a TV series came when she was cast in the short-lived ABC sitcom Free Spirit. As a teenager, Hannigan babysat for the children of her future How I Met Your Mother costar, Bob Saget.

Buffy years

In 1997, Hannigan was cast to play Willow Rosenberg, Buffy Summers' best friend, on the television series Buffy the Vampire Slayer.

The show became a success, and Hannigan gained recognition, subsequently appearing in several films aimed at teenaged audiences, including American Pie (1999), Boys and Girls (2000), American Pie 2 (2001), and American Wedding (2003). She also had a guest spot on the Buffy spin-off, Angel, reprising her role of Willow in a few episodes (including most notably "Orpheus", during the fourth season of Angel and the seventh season of Buffy), but none after Buffy finished production (the final episode of Buffy aired May 20, 2003; the Angel episode "Orpheus," the last in which Hannigan appears, aired March 19, 2003).

Stage, television, and movie work

In early 2004, Hannigan made her West End debut, starring in a stage adaptation of When Harry Met Sally... at the Theatre Royal Haymarket, opposite Luke Perry.

In 2005, Hannigan returned to starring in a regular television series, taking the main role of Lily Aldrin in the hit comedy How I Met Your Mother, and also playing a recurring guest role on Veronica Mars as Trina Echolls. In February 2006, she starred as Julia Jones in Date Movie, a parody of romantic comedies. She was also a guest star on the ABC animated sitcom The Goode Family in 2009.

Hannigan joined forces with Emily Deschanel, Jaime King, Minka Kelly, and Katharine McPhee in a "video slumber party" featured on FunnyorDie.com to promote regular breast cancer screenings for the organization Stand Up 2 Cancer.

In 2012, Hannigan reprised the role of Michelle in American Reunion. Since 2016, Hannigan has hosted the television series Penn & Teller: Fool Us.

Hannigan plays Ann Possible, Kim's mother, in the Disney Channel original film Kim Possible, based on the animated series.

Personal life
Hannigan married her Buffy the Vampire Slayer and Angel co-star Alexis Denisof at Two Bunch Palms Resort in Desert Hot Springs, California, on October 11, 2003. The couple live in Encino, Los Angeles with their two daughters: Satyana Marie, born in March 2009, and Keeva Jane, born in May 2012. Their home was used as a set for This Is Us.

Filmography

Film

Television

Stage

Awards and nominations

References

External links

 
 

1974 births
20th-century American actresses
21st-century American actresses
Actresses from Atlanta
Actresses from Los Angeles
Actresses from Washington, D.C.
American child actresses
American film actresses
American people of Irish descent
American stage actresses
American television actresses
California State University, Northridge alumni
Jewish American actresses
Living people
People from Encino, Los Angeles
North Hollywood High School alumni
21st-century American Jews